Balbir Singh Juneja Indoor Stadium is an Indoor stadium in Raipur, Chhattisgarh. The stadium is only indoor stadium in city and was named after Balbir Singh Juneja who was born in the city with capacity of 4,000. It is owned and managed by  Raipur Municipal Corporation.The stadium has facilities for games like basketball, volleyball, tennis, squash, table-tennis, badminton, and gymnastics. The stadium is home for Chhattisgarh's first professional sports team called Raipur Rangers which plays in Champions Tennis League.

References

Sports venues in Raipur, Chhattisgarh
Indoor arenas in India
Year of establishment missing